In the Company of Angels is a studio album from Caedmon's Call released in the United States on September 25, 2001 through Essential Records. This more than any other previous album by this band features songs of worship.

Track listing

 "We Delight"  – 3:25 (Joshua Moore)
 "Before There Was Time"  – 3:32 (Aaron Senseman, Cliff Young)
 "Thy Mercy"  – 2:43 (Sandra McCracken)
 "God Who Saves"  – 4:57 (Senseman)
 "Who You Are"  – 3:03 (Moore)
 "Carry Your Love"  – 4:24 (Senseman, Young)
 "God of Wonders"  – 4:05 (Steve Hindalong, Marc Byrd)
 "I Boast No More"  – 4:32 (Isaac Watts, McCracken)
 "Oh Lord Your Love"  – 3:44 (Young, Rich Mullins)
 "Warrior"  – 3:36 (Kemper Crabb)
 "Laden With Guilt"  – 3:41 (McCracken)
 "The Danse"  – 5:15 (Crabb)

Personnel 

Caedmon's Call
 Cliff Young – vocals, acoustic guitars
 Derek Webb – vocals, acoustic guitars, electric guitars
 Danielle Young – vocals
 Joshua Moore – acoustic piano, Rhodes piano, Wurlitzer electric piano, synthesizers, Hammond B3 organ, accordion, acoustic guitars, high-strung acoustic guitar, electric guitars, orchestra bells, string arrangements, backing vocals 
 Jeff Miller – bass, backing vocals 
 Todd Bragg – drums, percussion, didgeridoo
 Garett Buell – drums, percussion, timpani, drum programming

Guest musicians
 Ed Cash – guitar (1, 2, 4, 5, 9), backing vocals (1, 2, 4, 5, 9), banjo (3), mandolin (3, 4),  string orchestration (3), acoustic piano (9), Rhodes piano (9), percussion (9)
 Rodney Black – electric guitar (5)
 Kemper Crabb – mandolin (10)
 Derri Daugherty – mando-guitar (12)
 Steve Levine – penny whistle (12)
 Chris McDonald – string orchestration (1, 5)
 The Nashville String Machine – strings (1, 5)
 Rev David I. Bennett – Gospel choir director (6, 8)
 Josette Harrison – Gospel choir (6, 8)
 Nathan L. Owens – Gospel choir (6, 8)
 Clytel R. Helms – Gospel choir (6, 8)
 Cozer Sidney – Gospel choir (6, 8)
 Tans Perkins – Gospel choir (6, 8)
 Angelique Gibbs – Gospel choir (6, 8)
 Esther I. Bennett – Gospel choir (6, 8)

Production
 Caedmon's Call – producers 
 Ed Cash – producer (1, 2, 4, 5, 9)
 Bob Boyd – producer (3, 6, 7, 8, 10, 11), recording (1-6, 8-12), mixing (3, 4, 6-11), mastering 
 Joshua Moore – producer (3, 6, 7, 8, 10, 11), additional recording 
 Steve Hindalong – producer (12)
 Robert Beeson – executive producer 
 Bob Wohler – executive producer 
 Mark Sepulveda – engineer (7)
 Derri Daugherty – recording (12)
 Justin Loucks – additional recording 
 Jacob Meader – additional recording
 Chris Townsell – additional recording
 Ben Wisch – mixing (1, 2, 5)
 Grant Greene – mix assistant (1, 2, 5)
 David Schober – mixing (12)

Studios
 Recorded at Sunrise Studios and Second Studios (Houston, Texas).
 Mixed and Mastered at Ambient Digital (Houston, Texas)
 "God of Wonders" recorded live at Texas A&M University.
 "Warrior" recorded live at Second Baptist Church Houston (Houston, Texas).
 "The Danse" recorded at Earful Studios (Franklin, Tennessee); Mixed at Dark Horse Recording Studio (Franklin, Tennessee).

References 

Caedmon's Call albums
2001 albums
Essential Records (Christian) albums